The North Dakota Highway Patrol is the highway patrol agency for North Dakota and has jurisdiction anywhere within the state. It is a division of the North Dakota State Cabinet. Colonel Brandon Solberg has been serving as the 17th superintendent since July 1, 2018. 

North Dakota Highway Patrol established in 1935 by the North Dakota Legislative Assembly.

"The mission of the North Dakota Highway Patrol is to make a difference every day by providing high-quality law enforcement services to keep North Dakota safe and secure."

North Dakota state troopers, when hired, attend the Law Enforcement Training Academy in Bismarck. It is a 22-week program in which the recruits learn all Peace Officer Standards and Training as well as advanced traffic information.  Troopers are assigned to many different post locations within the four regions upon graduating from the Academy. 

Major activities of the State Patrol include: traffic enforcement, crash investigation, reporting road conditions, and enforcement of laws where state property is involved. A major duty of a North Dakota state trooper is the ability to work independently and exercise good judgement accordingly.  This may differ from other peace officer agencies where operations are teamwork oriented.

Regions
The state is divided into four regions.  Each region is commanded by a regional commander and contains two offices located in the major cities of the region.
 Northeast Region:  Grand Forks and Devils Lake
 Southeast Region:  Fargo and Jamestown
 Southwest Region:  Bismarck and Dickinson
 Northwest Region:  Minot and Williston

Troopers work within their regions, however they have equal jurisdiction throughout the state.

Highway Patrol symbol
The North Dakota Highway Patrol symbol is a profile of Red Tomahawk, a Teton Dakotah (Sioux) Indian who lived on his land near the Cannonball River on the Standing Rock Indian Reservation near Mandan, North Dakota and who is famous for shooting Sitting Bull in the head. The North Dakota Highway Patrol officially adopted the profile of Red Tomahawk as the patrol vehicle door emblem and department symbol in 1951.

Rank structure

The North Dakota Highway Patrol uses a paramilitary rank structure and has the following ranks:

Special Assignments
Troopers can serve in special roles including the following:

Aviation (Manned and Unmanned)
Crash Reconstruction Team (CRT)
Cultural Liaison Officer
Dignitary Protection
Drug Recognition Expert (DRE)
DUI Enforcement Team
Emergency Response Team (ERT)
Honor Guard
K9 Program

Superintendents of the North Dakota Highway Patrol

Fallen officers
Since the organization was established, one North Dakota Highway Patrol officer has died while on duty.

Vehicles

Current and historical patrol vehicles used by the North Dakota Highway Patrol.

See also

 List of law enforcement agencies in North Dakota
 State police
 Highway patrol

References

External links
North Dakota Highway Patrol website
Information about Col. Bryan Klipfel

State law enforcement agencies of North Dakota
Government agencies established in 1935
1935 establishments in North Dakota